Tiroler Volksschauspiele is a theatre in Austria.

Theatres in Austria
Tourist attractions in Tyrol (state)